Silver Lake is a small reservoir located south of the hamlet of Bovina Center in Delaware County, New York. Silver Lake drains northwest via an unnamed creek which flows into the Little Delaware River.

See also
 List of lakes in New York

References 

Lakes of New York (state)
Lakes of Delaware County, New York
Reservoirs in Delaware County, New York